Whitefield is a tram stop in the town of Whitefield, Greater Manchester, England. It is on the Bury Line of Greater Manchester's light rail Metrolink system.

History

Formerly Whitefield railway station located along the Manchester Victoria to Bury heavy rail line, the station was converted and opened for Metrolink use on 6 April 1992. It lies in ticketing zones 3 and 4. Extensive park and ride facilities were built in 2005 along with a new terminal for the old bus interchange. The area around the station was redeveloped, and is centred on a new Morrisons supermarket.

Services
Services mostly run every 12 minutes on 2 routes, forming a 6-minute service between Bury and Manchester at peak times.

Connecting bus routes
Whitefield is well served by buses, with some services stopping outside the station. Go North West's 98 and 135 services both stop on nearby Bury New Road and run between Bury and Manchester with the 98 running via Radcliffe and Prestwich and the 135 service, which runs frequently via Heaton Park and Cheetham Hill. Go North West also run Monday-Saturday services on the 95 which runs between Bury and Salford via Unsworth, Prestwich and Carr Clough.  Arriva used to run the 484 bus route terminating on Church Lane and ran to Prestwich and through to Eccles via Swinton.

Gallery

References

External links

Whitefield Stop Information
Whitefield area map

Tram stops in the Metropolitan Borough of Bury
Former Lancashire and Yorkshire Railway stations
Railway stations in Great Britain opened in 1879
Railway stations in Great Britain closed in 1991
Railway stations in Great Britain opened in 1992
Tram stops on the Altrincham to Bury line
Tram stops on the Bury to Ashton-under-Lyne line
Whitefield, Greater Manchester